Survivor – A sziget (season 4) is the fourth season of the Hungarian reality television series Survivor – A sziget. The season consists of 18 Hungarians competing in tribes of two for reward and immunity to avoid tribal council, where they vote one of their own off the tribe. The season was filmed in Caramoan, Philippines and presented by Bence Istenes, premiered on RTL Klub on 24 September 2018. The season concluded on 10 November 2018 when Dávid Tömböly won Ft. 20,000,000 against Fanni Sós in a 5-4 jury vote and also claimed the title of Sole Survivor.

Contestants

Notes

References

External links

Hungary
2018 Hungarian television seasons